The galerón are two genres of Venezuelan typical song. The Eastern galerón is sung in improvised ten-line stanzas. Generally, it is accompanied by mandolin, cuatro, and guitar. It is normally played in the Cruz de Mayo celebrations, the improvised lyrics honoring the Cross. It is related to the guajiro (Cuba), torbellino (Colombia), and trova (Puerto Rico).

The other galerón is sung in the Center-Western region of Venezuela, more specifically in Lara State. It is part of The Tamunangue, a ritual religious celebration honoring Saint Anthony of Padua. It is one of the Sones de Negros suite, which includes La Bella, La Juruminga, El Poco a Poco, El Yiyivamos, La Perrendenga, El Galerón, y El Seis Figureao. It is played with cuatro, cinco y medio AKA tiple venezolano, and guitar and sung in two voices.

See also 
Venezuelan music

Sources
Luis Felipe Ramón y Rivera. La Música Folklórica de Venezuela. Monte Ávila, 1976.
http://www.venezuelatuya.com/tradiciones/polos_jotas_y_galerones.htm

Venezuelan music
Song forms